Osun State University (UNIOSUN) is a multi-campus university established by the Osun State Government under the administration of Prince Olagunsoye Oyinlola. The university currently operates six campuses distributed across the six administrative zones of the state.

Nigeria's National Universities Commission approved Osun State University on 21 December 2006, as the 30th State University and the 80th in the Nigerian university system. It has its campuses in Osogbo, Ikire, Okuku, Ifetedo, Ipetu Ijesha and Ejigbo, which serves as campuses for Health science, Humanities and Culture, Social science and Management, Law, Education and Agriculture respectively.

Osun State University had its first convocation ceremony in 2011, under the administration of state Governor Ogbeni Rauf Aregbesola. The university had a reputation of not being involved in the Nationwide ASUU strike, until the 2013 ASUU strike which lasted for over five months. The university also has a reputation as one of the fastest universities in Nigeria, based on the quick academic calendar the school operates.

Colleges & Faculties/Departments

References

External links 

Universities and colleges in Nigeria
Osun State
Educational institutions established in 2006
2006 establishments in Nigeria